Notes receivable represents claims for which formal instruments of credit are issued as evidence of debt, such as a promissory note. The credit instrument normally requires the debtor to pay interest and extends for time periods of 30 days or longer. Notes receivable are considered current assets if they are to be paid within one year, and non-current if they are expected to be paid after one year.

References

Legal documents